The Douglas TBD Devastator was an American torpedo bomber of the United States Navy. Ordered in 1934, it first flew in 1935 and entered service in 1937. At that point, it was the most advanced aircraft flying for the Navy and possibly for any navy in the world. However, the fast pace of aircraft development quickly caught up with it, and by the time of the Japanese attack on Pearl Harbor the TBD was already outdated.

The Devastator performed well in early battles, most notably in the Battle of Coral Sea, but earned notoriety for a catastrophic performance during the Battle of Midway in which 41 Devastators recorded zero torpedo hits with only six surviving to return to their carriers. Vastly outclassed in both speed and maneuverability by the Mitsubishi Zero fighters they faced, most of the force was wiped out with little consequence except to distract the Zeros from the SBD Dauntless dive bombers that sank four carriers and a heavy cruiser. Although much of the Devastator's dismal performance was later attributed to the many well-documented defects in the US Mark 13 torpedo, the aircraft was withdrawn from frontline service after Midway, being replaced by the Grumman TBF Avenger.

Design and development

The Douglas XTBD-1 was ordered on 30 June 1934 after being one of the winners of a US Navy competition for new bombers to operate from its aircraft carriers. Other aircraft also ordered for production as a result of the competition included the Brewster SBA, the Vought SB2U Vindicator, and the Northrop BT-1, the last of which would evolve into the Douglas SBD Dauntless. The Great Lakes XB2G, Great Lakes XTBG, Grumman XSBF, Hall XPTBH and Vought XSB3U were also tendered to the specification but were not developed beyond prototype status.

The XTBD Devastator flew for the first time on 15 April 1935 while  marking a number of "firsts" for the US Navy. It was the first American carrier-based monoplane to be widely used, the first all-metal naval aircraft, the first with a completely enclosed cockpit, the first with power-actuated (hydraulically) folding wings. A crew of three was normally carried beneath a large "greenhouse" canopy almost half the length of the aircraft. The pilot sat in front; a rear gunner/radio operator took the rearmost position, while the bombardier occupied the middle seat. During a bombing run, the bombardier lay prone, sliding into position under the pilot to sight through a window in the bottom of the fuselage, using the Norden bombsight.

The normal TBD offensive armament consisted of either a  Bliss-Leavitt Mark 13 aerial torpedo or a  bomb  carried semi-recessed in the fuselage. Alternatively, three  general-purpose bombs (one under each wing root and one inside the fuselage), or twelve  fragmentation bombs (six under each wing root), could be carried. This weapons load would often be used when attacking Japanese targets on the Gilbert and Marshall Islands in 1942. Defensive armament consisted of a  Browning machine gun for the rear gunner.

The powerplant was a  Pratt & Whitney R-1830-64 Twin Wasp radial engine, a development of the prototype's  Pratt & Whitney XR-1830-60/R-1830-1. Other changes from the 1935 prototype included a revised engine cowling and a raised cockpit canopy to improve visibility.

The XTBD had a flat canopy that was replaced on production models by a higher, domed canopy with a rollover bar. Other than requests by test pilots to improve pilot visibility, the prototype easily passed its acceptance trials that ran from 24 April to 24 November 1935 at NAS (Naval Air Station) Anacostia and Norfolk bases. The extended service trials continued until 1937 with the first two production aircraft retained by the company exclusively for testing.

Even prewar, TBD units were being shifted to training duties with at least one aircraft being converted to target tug duty. By 1940, the US Navy was aware that the TBD had become outclassed and a replacement, the Grumman TBF Avenger, was in the works, but it was not yet operational when the US entered World War II. Attrition had by then reduced their numbers to just over 100 aircraft. When the US Navy assigned popular names to its aircraft in late 1941, the TBD became the Devastator, although its nickname "torpecker" was still commonly used.

Operational history

In the early days of the Pacific war, the TBD acquitted itself well during February and March 1942, with TBDs from Enterprise and Yorktown attacking targets in the Marshall and Gilbert Islands, Wake and Marcus Islands, while TBDs from Yorktown and Lexington struck Japanese shipping off New Guinea on 10 March.

Faults were discovered with the Mark 13 torpedo at this point. Many were seen to hit the target yet failed to explode; there was also a tendency to run deeper than the set depth. It took over a year for the defects to be corrected. These problems were not fixed by the time of the Battle of Midway on 4 June 1942.

At Midway, a total of 41 Devastators, the majority of the type still operational, were launched from Hornet, Enterprise and Yorktown to attack the Japanese fleet. The sorties were not well coordinated, in part because Rear Admiral Raymond A. Spruance ordered a strike on the enemy carriers immediately after they were discovered, rather than spending time assembling a well-coordinated attack involving the different types of aircraft – fighters, bombers, torpedo planes – reasoning that attacking the Japanese would prevent a counterstrike against the US carriers. The TBDs from Hornet and Enterprise lost contact with their escort and started their attacks without fighter protection.

The Devastator proved to be a death trap for its crews: slow and hardly maneuverable, with poor armor for the era; its speed on a glide-bombing approach was a mere , making it easy prey for fighters and defensive guns alike. The aerial torpedo could not even be released at speeds above . Torpedo delivery requires a long, straight-line attack run, making the aircraft vulnerable, and the slow speed of the aircraft made them easy targets for the Mitsubishi A6M Zeros. Only four TBDs made it back to Enterprise, none to Hornet and two to Yorktown, without scoring a torpedo hit.

Nonetheless, their sacrifice was not completely in vain, as several TBDs managed to get within a few ship-lengths range of their targets before dropping their torpedoes, being close enough to be able to strafe the enemy ships and force the Japanese carriers to take sharp evasive maneuvers. By obliging the Japanese to keep their flight decks clear and to continually cycle and reinforce their combat air patrols, they prevented any Japanese counter-attacks against the American carriers, just as Spruance had anticipated. These windows of opportunity were exploited by the late-arriving Douglas SBD Dauntless dive bombers led by Lieutenant Commander C. Wade McClusky and Max Leslie, which dive-bombed and fatally damaged three of the four Japanese carriers about one hour after the first TBD torpedo attacks had developed. While the Devastators faced the stiff defenses of the carriers and their fighters, their attacks served to distract the Japanese attention from the Dauntless dive bombers' strikes, resulting in relatively lighter resistance from the IJN carriers' defensive fighter patrols, and more effective American attacks that crippled the IJN carrier forces.

Obsolescence
The Navy immediately withdrew the 39 remaining TBDs from frontline units after the debacle at Midway. The surviving Devastators in VT-4 and VT-7 remained in service briefly in the Atlantic and in training squadrons until 1944. Many were relegated to training duties for pilots and mechanics or were destroyed following use as instructional airframes for firefighting training. By late 1944, no TBD Devastators were left in the US Navy inventory. The original prototype finished its career at NAS Norman, Oklahoma; the last TBD in the US Navy was used by the Commander of Fleet Air Activities-West Coast. When his TBD was scrapped in November 1944, there were no more. None survived the war and there are none known to exist on dry land today.

In fairness to the Devastator, the newer TBF Avengers were similarly ineffective in 1942, losing five out of six aircraft without scoring a hit during the Battle of Midway. The Avengers' only successes in 1942 would be against the light carrier  and the battleship   In the initial part of the Pacific War, the poor performance of US torpedo bombers was due to the vulnerability of that type in general against fire from anti-aircraft artillery and defending fighters, plus the inexperience of American pilots and lack of coordinated fighter cover, as well as serious defects in US torpedoes which were not discovered and corrected until the fall of 1943. It took growing American air superiority, improved attack coordination, and more experienced pilots, before the Avengers were able to successfully accomplish their roles in subsequent battles against Japanese surface forces.

Variants
XTBD-1
Prototype powered by an  XR-1830-60, one built.
TBD-1
Production variant powered by an  R-1830-64, 129 built.
TBD-1A
One TBD-1 modified with twin floats.

Operators

United States Navy
VT-2 used 58 Devastators between December 1937 and May 1942.
VT-3 used 71 Devastators between October 1937 and June 1942. They starred in the 1941 movie Dive Bomber.
VT-4 used nine Devastators between December 1941 and September 1942.
VT-5 used 57 Devastators between February 1938 and June 1942.
VT-6 used 62 Devastators between April 1938 and June 1942.
VT-7 used 5 Devastators between January 1942 and July 1942.
VT-8 used 23 Devastators between September 1941 and June 1942.
VB-4 used three Devastators between December 1941 and January 1942.
VS-42 used three Devastators between December 1940 and December 1941.
VS-71 used eight Devastators between December 1940 and June 1942.
VS-72 used two Devastators in June 1941.
VU-3 used a single Devastator from January until May 1940.
United States Marine Corps
VMS-2 used a single Devastator, BuNo. 1518, from 26 March 1941 till 5 June 1941, loaned from VT-3.

Surviving aircraft

There are no surviving aircraft in museums or private collections, nor are there any currently under restoration. However, below are eleven underwater aircraft that are known to exist and are the closest to a complete airframe. An expedition has been proposed to recover several TBDs from USS Lexington (CV-2). Note that these aircraft exist in varying degrees of intactness due to circumstances of their loss and subsequent saltwater corrosion. For example, the pair at Jaluit, a shallow warm-water atoll, have reef creatures growing on their exteriors; several of those lost at Coral Sea have broken wings and fuselages due to avgas explosions and their free-fall to the deep sea floor.

TBD-1, Bureau Numbers 0298 and 1515
Ex-VT-5 / USS Yorktown (CV-5) "5-T-7", "5-T-6" Jaluit Lagoon, Marshall Islands.
TBD-1 BuNo 0353
Ex-NAS Miami, Atlantic Ocean, Miami, Florida.
TBD-1 BuNo 0377
Ex-VT-2 / USS Lexington (CV-2) "6-T-7", Pacific Ocean, Mission Beach, California.
Wreck of the 
On 4 March 2018, Paul G. Allen's R/V Petrel team discovered the wreck of the USS Lexington at 3,000 meters (about two miles) below the surface, resting on the floor of the Coral Sea more than 500 miles off the eastern coast of Australia. Near the wreck were the remains of seven Devastators, as well as an F4F-3 Wildcat.

Replica

On September 19, 2019, the USS Midway Museum acquired a 1:1 scale replica used in the World War II movie, Midway. The plane was donated from Lionsgate following the conclusion of filming and will become an exhibit on 's hangar.

Specifications (TBD-1)

Notable appearance in media
Dive Bomber (1941) was an American film directed by Michael Curtiz. It is notable for both its Technicolor photography of pre-World War II United States Navy aircraft featuring the TBD Devastator, and scenes on the aircraft carrier  as well as the NAS North Island in San Diego.

The 2014 film Against the Sun depicts a real-life story of the survival of a Devastator's crew after it had to ditch due to running out of fuel. The crew survived 34 days adrift.

The 2019 film Midway featured the Devastator, most notably the disastrous attack by VT-8, including its only survivor, Ensign George Gay, using his plane's seat cushion to conceal himself from the Japanese as he watched the SBDs bomb the IJN Carrier force.

See also

References

Notes

Citations

Bibliography

 Adcock, Al. TBD Devastator in Action, Aircraft Number 97. Carrollton, TX: Squadron/Signal Publications Inc., 1989. .
 Buell, Thomas B. The Quiet Warrior: A Biography of Admiral Raymond A. Spruance. Annapolis, MD: US Naval Institute Press, 1987. .
 Cressman, Robert B. et al. A Glorious Page in Our History: The Battle of Midway, 4–6 June 1942. Missoula, MT: Pictorial Histories Publishing Company, 1990. .
 "Devastator...The Not-so-Devastating TDB-1". Air International, March 1990, Vol 38 No 2. pp. 148–156. ISSN 0306-5634.
 Dolan, Edward F. Jr. Hollywood Goes to War. London: Bison Books, 1985. .
 Doll, Thomas E. The Douglas TBD Devastator, Aircraft in Profile Number 171. Leatherhead, Surrey, UK: Profile Publications Ltd., 1967. No ISBN.
 Doll, Thomas E. SB2U Vindicator in action, Aircraft Number 122. Carrollton, TX: Squadron/Signal Publications Inc., 1992. .
 Drendel, Lou. U.S. Navy Carrier Bombers of World War II. Carrollton, TX: Squadron/Signal Publications Inc., 1987. .
 Ginter, Steve. Douglas TBD-1 Devastator, Naval Fighters Number Seventy-one. Simi Valley, California: Ginter Publishing Company, 2006. .
 Gunston, Bill. The Encyclopedia of the World's Combat Aircraft: A Technical Directory of Major Warplanes from World War 1 to the Present Day. New York: Chartwell Books, Inc., 1976. .
 Hardwick, Jack and Ed Schnepf. "A Viewer's Guide to Aviation Movies". The Making of the Great Aviation Films, General Aviation Series, Volume 2, 1989.
 Jackson, B.R. and Thomas E. Doll. Douglas TBD-1 "Devastator", Aero Series 23. Fallbrook, CA: Aero Publishers, 1973. .
 Kinzey, Bert. U.S. Navy and Marine Aircraft of World War II, Part 1: Dive and Torpedo Bombers. Northbrook, Illinois: Revell-Monogram, LLC, 2003. .
 Lawson, Robert and Barrett Tillman. U.S. Navy Dive and Torpedo Bombers of WWII. St. Paul, MN: MBI Publishing Company, 2001. .
 Mondey, David. "Douglas TBD Devastator." The Hamlyn Concise Guide to American Aircraft of World War II. London: Bounty Books, 2006. .
 Nowicki, Jacek. Douglas TBD Devastator – SBD Dauntless (Wydawnictwo Militaria 119) (in Polish). Warszawa, Poland: Wydawnictwo Militaria, 2000. .
 Orriss, Bruce. When Hollywood Ruled the Skies: The Aviation Film Classics of World War II. Hawthorne, California: Aero Associates Inc., 1984. .
 Parshall, Jonathan B. and Anthony P. Tully. Shattered Sword: The Untold Story of the Battle of Midway. Washington, DC: Potomac Books, 2005. .
 Taylor, John W.R. "Douglas TBD Devastator". Combat Aircraft of the World from 1909 to the Present. New York: G.P. Putnam's Sons, 1969. .
 Tillman, Barrett. "Go in and get a hit!: The Navy's last combat torpedo bombers." Airpower, Volume 3, No. 4, July 1973.
 Tillman, Barrett. TBD Devastator Units of the U.S. Navy, Combat Aircraft Vol. 20. Oxford, UK: Osprey Publishing, 2000. .
 Tillman, Barrett and Robert L. Lawson. U.S. Navy Dive and Torpedo Bombers of WWII. St. Paul, Minnesota: MBI Publishing Company, 2001. .
 Winchester, Jim. "Douglas TBD Devastator." Aircraft of World War II (The Aviation Factfile). Kent, UK: Grange Books plc, 2004. .

External links

www.history.navy.mil
VT-8 in Color
www.daveswarbirds.com
www.aviation-history.com
Navy Plane Folds Wings As It Taxies On Deck, May 1938, Popular Mechanics article has very rare photos of prototype
Douglas TBD-1 Devastator Production List

Carrier-based aircraft
1930s United States bomber aircraft
World War II torpedo bombers of the United States
TBD Devastator
Single-engined tractor aircraft
Aircraft first flown in 1935